Dragan Radović (born 12 December 1976), also known by his nickname Prle, is a Montenegrin basketball coach and former player. He currently serves both as an assistant coach and youth system coordinator for Podgorica of the Prva A Liga and the ABA League Second Division.

Coaching career
Radović started his coaching career in his hometown team Lovćen 1947 in 2003 as an assistant coach. In 2005, he became a head coach and led the Lovćen for two seasons. Later he also coached Lovćen 1947 from 2011 to 2014. Also, he coached other teams from Montenegrin Basketball League such as Ulcinj, Jedinstvo and Teodo Tivat. Prior to 2016–17 season, he was hired to be the head coach of the Bashkimi Prizren in the Kosovo Superleague and the BIBL.

On 14 July 2017, Radović signed for his third term as head coach for the Lovćen 1947. On February 15, 2018, he parted ways with Lovćen.

In July 2021, Montenegrin team Podgorica named him their new assistant coach and youth system coordinator.

National team
Radović was a head coach for the Montenegro men's national under-18 basketball team from 2012 to 2015. He won a gold medal at 2013 FIBA Europe Under-18 Championship Division B.

Career achievements
2013 FIBA Europe Under-18 Championship Division B:

References

External links
Radovic ABA League Profile
Coach Profile at eurobasket.com

1976 births
Living people
KK Lovćen coaches
KK Lovćen players
KK Teodo Tivat coaches
Montenegrin basketball coaches
Montenegrin expatriate basketball people in Kosovo
Montenegrin men's basketball players
Sportspeople from Cetinje